Nazari Kulchytskyy (born June 3, 1992) is a Ukrainian-American retired freestyle and folkstyle wrestler, who currently coaches at Team Nazar Training Center. In Ukraine, he was a five-time age-group National champion and a European age-group medalist. Since arriving to the United States, he captured Pan American runner-up honors, three Dave Schultz Memorial medals and a Cerro Pelado International gold medal. As a collegiate wrestler, Kulchytskyy was a three-time NCAA Division III champion out of the University of Wisconsin–Oshkosh.

Early life 
Kulchytzkyy was born in a small and rural town of Ukraine. He started training in freestyle when he was seven years old and always had to wrestle older kids as those were the tournaments he qualified for. When he was twelve (years old), he moved to Odessa with his coach to attend school and follow a strict training program. Since then, he had tremendous success in the Ukrainian circuit, with five National titles as a cadet and a bronze medal at the Cadet European Championships of 2008, same year in which he and other members of his family were granted the green card visa they had been looking for since years back to immigrate to the United States of America.

University 
After his senior year of high school, in which he did not compete as he was considered a professional due to his accomplishments, Kulchytzkyy attended a Division III college in University of Wisconsin–Oshkosh.

He's the most accomplished wrestler in the history of the Titans, having won three Division III National titles and earning NCAA Division III Wrestler of the Year honors twice. Despite of his initial wish of transferring to a Division I university, he refused to transfer as a junior and graduated with a 143–5 record, with only one loss to a DIII athlete.

Freestyle

Youth 
Won a bronze medal for Ukraine at the Cadet European Championships and was a multiple time National champion there. He also won a FILA USA National championship as a junior, where he defeated future three-time NCAA DI champion Alex Dieringer.

Senior 
In 2014, Kulchytskyy was granted a US citizenship and was able to compete at the 15' US World Team Trials Challenge tournament after winning the Northeastern Regionals. He went 2–2 at the tournament and did not qualify for the best-of-three. In 2017, he won a Cerro Pelado International gold medal and became the US Open runner-up, qualifying for the 17' US World Team Trials. At the trials, he lost to Jim Kennedy in the finals and then to Jason Nolf in the true-third match.

At the 16' and 17' Dave Schultz Memorial International, Kulchytskyy recorded bronze medals. In November 2017, he became runner-up of the Henri Deglane Challenge and helped Team USA reach the same honors as a team at the Clubs World Cup, where he had already competed last year and had reached first place with the Team. Since then, he has won a silver medal at the 18' Pan American Championships and bronze medals at the 19' Bill Farrell Memorial and the 20' Granma and Cerro Pelado.

On June 28, 2020, Kulchytskyy competed at Rumble on the Rooftop. He won his match by technical fall and subsequently retired from the sport to focus on coaching.

He holds notable victories over:

NCAA DI champions: Mekhi Lewis, Jayson Ness (twice), Derek St. John.

NCAA DI All-Americans: Dylan Ness (four-time, two-time finalist - twice), Tyler Berger (three-time, finalist), Alec Pantaleo (three-time - twice), Evan Wick (three-time), Dan Vallimont (two-time, finalist), Dave Habat (two-time, finalist - twice), Chad Walsh (two-time), Chase Pami (two-time), Hunter Stieber (two-time), Ganbayar Sanjaa (two-time), Kevin LeValley (two-time), Adam Hall (two-time), Joey Lavalle (one-time, finalist) Rick Durso, Nick Dardanes (twice), Max Thomsen, Thomas Gantt (thrice), Michael DePalma, Anthony Collica.

Coaching career 
In July 2020, Kulchytskyy opened up a wrestling facility in Stoughton, Wisconsin called Team Nazar Training Center.

Freestyle record 

! colspan="7"| Senior Freestyle Matches
|-
!  Res.
!  Record
!  Opponent
!  Score
!  Date
!  Event
!  Location
|-
|Win
|70-29
|align=left| Danny Braunagel
|style="font-size:88%"|TF 10-0
|style="font-size:88%"|June 28, 2020
|style="font-size:88%"|2020 Rumble on the Rooftop
|style="text-align:left;font-size:88%;" |
 Chicago, Illinois
|-
! style=background:white colspan=7 |
|-
|Win
|69-29
|align=left| Dan Vallimont
|style="font-size:88%"|5-0
|style="font-size:88%" rowspan=3|February 9–17, 2020
|style="font-size:88%" rowspan=3|2020 Granma y Cerro Pelado 
|style="text-align:left;font-size:88%;" rowspan=3|
 Havana, Cuba
|-
|Loss
|68-29
|align=left| Franklin Marén
|style="font-size:88%"|2-3
|-
|Win
|68-28
|align=left| Jorge Despaigne
|style="font-size:88%"|6-0
|-
! style=background:white colspan=7 |
|-
|Loss
|67-28
|align=left| Anthony Valencia
|style="font-size:88%"|TF 1-11
|style="font-size:88%" rowspan=7|December 20–22, 2019
|style="font-size:88%" rowspan=7|2019 Senior Nationals - US Olympic Trials Qualifier
|style="text-align:left;font-size:88%;" rowspan=7|
 Fort Worth, Texas
|-
|Loss
|67-27
|align=left| Evan Wick
|style="font-size:88%"|2-4
|-
|Loss
|67-26
|align=left| Logan Massa
|style="font-size:88%"|6-15
|-
|Win
|67-25
|align=left| Alec Pantaleo
|style="font-size:88%"|TF 14-3
|-
|Win
|66-25
|align=left| Joey Lavallee
|style="font-size:88%"|3-2
|-
|Win
|65-25
|align=left| Chad Walsh
|style="font-size:88%"|TF 11-0
|-
|Win
|64-25
|align=left| Jake Keating
|style="font-size:88%"|TF 10-0
|-
! style=background:white colspan=7 |
|-
|Win
|63-25
|align=left| Mekhi Lewis
|style="font-size:88%"|9-3
|style="font-size:88%" rowspan=5|November 15–16, 2019
|style="font-size:88%" rowspan=5|2019 Bill Farrell Memorial International Open
|style="text-align:left;font-size:88%;" rowspan=5|
 New York City, New York
|-
|Win
|62-25
|align=left| Tyler Berger
|style="font-size:88%"|6-2
|-
|Loss
|61-25
|align=left| Isaiah Martinez
|style="font-size:88%"|5-12
|-
|Win
|61-24
|align=left| Dylan Ness
|style="font-size:88%"|6-1
|-
|Win
|60-24
|align=left| Rob Mathers
|style="font-size:88%"|Fall
|-
! style=background:white colspan=7 |
|-
|Loss
|59-24
|align=left| Mario Mason
|style="font-size:88%"|1-5
|style="font-size:88%" rowspan=2|May 17–19, 2019
|style="font-size:88%" rowspan=2|2019 US World Team Trials Challenge Tournament
|style="text-align:left;font-size:88%;" rowspan=2|
 Raleigh, North Carolina
|-
|Loss
|59-23
|align=left| Brandon Sorensen
|style="font-size:88%"|1-5
|-
! style=background:white colspan=7 |
|-
|Win
|59-22
|align=left| Anthony Collica
|style="font-size:88%"|TF 10-0
|style="font-size:88%" rowspan=5|April 24–27, 2019
|style="font-size:88%" rowspan=5|2019 US Open Championships
|style="text-align:left;font-size:88%;" rowspan=5|
 Las Vegas, Nevada
|-
|Win
|58-22
|align=left| Elroy Perkin
|style="font-size:88%"|12-10
|-
|Loss
|57-22
|align=left| Jason Nolf
|style="font-size:88%"|TF 2-13
|-
|Win
|57-21
|align=left| Destin McCauley
|style="font-size:88%"|TF 12-1
|-
|Win
|56-21
|align=left| Renaldo Rodriguez Spencer
|style="font-size:88%"|6-5
|-
! style=background:white colspan=7 |
|-
|Loss
|55-21
|align=left| Liván López
|style="font-size:88%"|1-6
|style="font-size:88%" rowspan=3|May 3–6, 2018
|style="font-size:88%" rowspan=3|2018 Pan American Wrestling Championships
|style="text-align:left;font-size:88%;" rowspan=3|
 Lima, Perú
|-
|Win
|55-20
|align=left| Carlos Romero
|style="font-size:88%"|TF 10-0
|-
|Win
|54-20
|align=left| Jorge Llano
|style="font-size:88%"|TF 11-0
|-
! style=background:white colspan=7 |
|-
|Loss
|53-20
|align=left| Isaiah Martinez
|style="font-size:88%"|TF 2-13
|style="font-size:88%" rowspan=4|May 18–20, 2018
|style="font-size:88%" rowspan=4|2018 US World Team Trials Challenge
|style="text-align:left;font-size:88%;" rowspan=4|
 Rochester, Minnesota
|-
|Loss
|53-19
|align=left| Isaiah Martinez
|style="font-size:88%"|TF 2-13
|-
|Win
|53-18
|align=left| Thomas Gantt
|style="font-size:88%"|5-3
|-
|Win
|52-18
|align=left| Evan Wick
|style="font-size:88%"|Fall
|-
! style=background:white colspan=7 |
|-
|Loss
|51-18
|align=left| Konstantin Vlasov
|style="font-size:88%"|0-3
|style="font-size:88%" rowspan=2|February 23–25, 2018
|style="font-size:88%" rowspan=2|2018 Outstanding Ukrainian Wrestlers and Coaches Memorial
|style="text-align:left;font-size:88%;" rowspan=2|
 Kyiv, Ukraine
|-
|Win
|51-17
|align=left| Bulat Ataev
|style="font-size:88%"|6-1
|-
! style=background:white colspan=7 |
|-
|Win
|50-17
|align=left| Hossein Elyasi
|style="font-size:88%"|5-4
|style="font-size:88%" rowspan=5|December 7–8, 2017
|style="font-size:88%" rowspan=5|2017 World Wrestling Clubs Cup
|style="text-align:left;font-size:88%;" rowspan=5|
 Tehran, Iran
|-
|Win
|49-17
|align=left| Boldkhuu Batsukh
|style="font-size:88%"|10-2
|-
|Win
|48-17
|Persiyan Mihov
|style="font-size:88%"|9-2
|-
|Win
|47-17
|align=left| Veer Dev Gulia
|style="font-size:88%"|TF 10-0
|-
|Win
|46-17
|align=left| Guseyn Ruslanzada
|style="font-size:88%"|TF 10-0
|-
! style=background:white colspan=7 |
|-
|Loss
|45-17
|align=left| Johnny Bur
|style="font-size:88%"|2-4
|style="font-size:88%" rowspan=2|November 24–25, 2017
|style="font-size:88%" rowspan=2|2017 Henri Deglane Challenge
|style="text-align:left;font-size:88%;" rowspan=2|
 Nice, France
|-
|Win
|45-16
|align=left| Salvatore Diana
|style="font-size:88%"|TF 10-0
|-
! style=background:white colspan=7 |
|-
|Win
|44-16
|align=left| Rasul Dzhukayev
|style="font-size:88%"|5-2
|style="font-size:88%" rowspan=2|November 1–4, 2017
|style="font-size:88%" rowspan=2|2017 Dave Schultz Memorial Invitational
|style="text-align:left;font-size:88%;" rowspan=2|
 Colorado Springs, Colorado
|-
|Win
|43-16
|align=left| Dylan Ness
|style="font-size:88%"|TF 12-0
|-
! style=background:white colspan=7 |
|-
|Loss
|42-16
|align=left| Jason Nolf
|style="font-size:88%"|2-7
|style="font-size:88%" rowspan=4|June 9–10, 2017
|style="font-size:88%" rowspan=4|2017 US World Team Trials Challenge Tournament
|style="text-align:left;font-size:88%;" rowspan=4|
 Lincoln, Nebraska
|-
|Loss
|42-15
|align=left| Jimmy Kennedy
|style="font-size:88%"|0-7
|-
|Win
|42-14
|align=left| Chase Pami
|style="font-size:88%"|4-3
|-
|Win
|41-14
|align=left| Thomas Gantt
|style="font-size:88%"|10-7
|-
! style=background:white colspan=7 |
|-
|Loss
|40-14
|align=left| James Green
|style="font-size:88%"|1-4
|style="font-size:88%" rowspan=5|April 26–29, 2017
|style="font-size:88%" rowspan=5|2017 US Open Championships
|style="text-align:left;font-size:88%;" rowspan=5|
 Las Vegas, Nevada
|-
|Win
|40-13
|align=left| Alec Pantaleo
|style="font-size:88%"|TF 10-0
|-
|Win
|39-13
|align=left| Hunter Stieber
|style="font-size:88%"|TF 10-0
|-
|Win
|38-13
|align=left| Tommy Pawelski
|style="font-size:88%"|TF 10-0
|-
|Win
|37-13
|align=left| Levi Calhoun
|style="font-size:88%"|TF 10-0
|-
! style=background:white colspan=7 |
|-
|Win
|36-13
|align=left| Ernesto Sanchez
|style="font-size:88%"|TF 11-1
|style="font-size:88%" rowspan=3|February 17–23, 2017
|style="font-size:88%" rowspan=3|2017 Cerro Pelado International 
|style="text-align:left;font-size:88%;" rowspan=3|
 Havana, Cuba
|-
|Win
|35-13
|align=left| Michael DePalma
|style="font-size:88%"|Fall
|-
|Win
|34-13
|align=left| Serguei Randon
|style="font-size:88%"|TF 10-0
|-
! style=background:white colspan=7 |
|-
|Win
|33-13
|align=left| Michael DePalma
|style="font-size:88%"|Fall
|style="font-size:88%" rowspan=4|January 31-February 3, 2017
|style="font-size:88%" rowspan=4|2017 Dave Schultz Memorial International
|style="text-align:left;font-size:88%;" rowspan=4|
 Colorado Springs, Colorado
|-
|Win
|32-13
|align=left| Thomas Gantt
|style="font-size:88%"|TF 11-0
|-
|Loss
|31-13
|align=left| Jordan Oliver
|style="font-size:88%"|2-7
|-
|Win
|31-12
|align=left| Robert Zyko
|style="font-size:88%"|TF 10-0
|-
! style=background:white colspan=7 |
|-
|Win
|30-12
|align=left| Atsamaz Sanakoev
|style="font-size:88%"|6-2
|style="font-size:88%" rowspan=4|November 30-December 1, 2016
|style="font-size:88%" rowspan=4|2016 World Wrestling Clubs Cup
|style="text-align:left;font-size:88%;" rowspan=4|
 Kharkiv, Ukraine
|-
|Loss
|29-12
|align=left| Semen Radulov
|style="font-size:88%"|0-5
|-
|Loss
|29-11
|align=left| Aleksander Jatchvadze
|style="font-size:88%"|1-3
|-
|Win
|29-10
|align=left| Vasil Mikhailov
|style="font-size:88%"|10-5
|-
! style=background:white colspan=7 |
|-
|Loss
|28-10
|align=left| Bernard Futrell
|style="font-size:88%"|2-8
|style="font-size:88%" rowspan=4|April 1–4, 2016
|style="font-size:88%" rowspan=4|2016 US Last Chance Olympic Team Trials Qualifier
|style="text-align:left;font-size:88%;" rowspan=4|
 Cedar Falls, Iowa
|-
|Win
|28-9
|align=left| Nick Dardanes
|style="font-size:88%"|4-3
|-
|Win
|27-9
|align=left| Max Thomsen
|style="font-size:88%"|8-3
|-
|Win
|26-9
|align=left| John Meeks
|style="font-size:88%"|10-2
|-
! style=background:white colspan=7 |
|-
|Win
|25-9
|align=left| Dave Habat
|style="font-size:88%"|TF 10-0
|style="font-size:88%" rowspan=4|January 28–30, 2016
|style="font-size:88%" rowspan=4|2016 Dave Schultz Memorial International
|style="text-align:left;font-size:88%;" rowspan=4|
 Colorado Springs, Colorado
|-
|Win
|24-9
|align=left| Nick Dardanes
|style="font-size:88%"|TF 12-0
|-
|Loss
|23-9
|align=left| Bernard Futrell
|style="font-size:88%"|1-4
|-
|Win
|23-8
|align=left| Dave Habat
|style="font-size:88%"|TF 11-0
|-
! style=background:white colspan=7 |
|-
|Loss
|22-8
|align=left| Frank Molinaro
|style="font-size:88%"|7-16
|style="font-size:88%" rowspan=4|December 17–19, 2015
|style="font-size:88%" rowspan=4|2015 Senior Nationals & Trials Qualifier
|style="text-align:left;font-size:88%;" rowspan=4|
 Las Vegas, Nevada
|-
|Win
|22-7
|align=left| Jayson Ness
|style="font-size:88%"|13-4
|-
|Loss
|21-7
|align=left| Bernard Futrell
|style="font-size:88%"|TF 0-12
|-
|Win
|21-6
|align=left| Marcus Cobbs
|style="font-size:88%"|TF 10-0
|-
! style=background:white colspan=7 |
|-
|Win
|20-6
|align=left| George Bucur
|style="font-size:88%"|8-6
|style="font-size:88%" rowspan=4|November 27–28, 2015
|style="font-size:88%" rowspan=4|2015 Henri Deglane Challenge
|style="text-align:left;font-size:88%;" rowspan=4|
 Nice, France
|-
|Win
|19-6
|align=left| Maxime Fiquet
|style="font-size:88%"|8-7
|-
|Win
|18-6
|align=left| Lázaro Carbonell
|style="font-size:88%"|TF 13-2
|-
|Win
|17-6
|align=left| Ali Samiei Paghaleh
|style="font-size:88%"|TF 10-0
|-
! style=background:white colspan=7 |
|-
|Loss
|16-6
|align=left| Aaron Pico
|style="font-size:88%"|2-8
|style="font-size:88%" rowspan=5|November 5–7, 2015
|style="font-size:88%" rowspan=5|2015 Bill Farrell International Open
|style="text-align:left;font-size:88%;" rowspan=5|
 New York City
|-
|Win
|16-5
|align=left| Mario Mason
|style="font-size:88%"|9-5
|-
|Loss
|15-5
|align=left| Jordan Oliver
|style="font-size:88%"|2-5
|-
|Win
|15-4
|align=left| Jayson Ness
|style="font-size:88%"|9-2
|-
|Win
|14-4
|align=left| Isiah DeGuzman
|style="font-size:88%"|TF 10-0
|-
! style=background:white colspan=7 |
|-
|Loss
|13-4
|align=left| Kevin LeValley
|style="font-size:88%"|3-5
|style="font-size:88%" rowspan=4|June 12–14, 2015
|style="font-size:88%" rowspan=4|2015 US World Team Trials Challenge Tournament
|style="text-align:left;font-size:88%;" rowspan=4|
 Madison, Wisconsin
|-
|Win
|13-3
|align=left| Derek St. John
|style="font-size:88%"|TF 10-0
|-
|Win
|12-3
|align=left| Adam Hall
|style="font-size:88%"|TF 10-0
|-
|Loss
|11-3
|align=left| James Green
|style="font-size:88%"|7-9
|-
! style=background:white colspan=7 |
|-
|Win
|11-2
|align=left| Rick Durso
|style="font-size:88%"|5-0
|style="font-size:88%" rowspan=5|May 1–3, 2015
|style="font-size:88%" rowspan=5|2015 Phil Portuese Northeastern Regionals 
|style="text-align:left;font-size:88%;" rowspan=5|
 East Stroudsburg, Pennsylvania
|-
|Win
|10-2
|align=left| Fox Baldwin
|style="font-size:88%"|TF 12-2
|-
|Win
|9-2
|align=left| Connor Lapresi
|style="font-size:88%"|TF 10-0
|-
|Win
|8-2
|align=left| Michael Mitchell
|style="font-size:88%"|TF 10-0
|-
|Win
|7-2
|align=left| Carlos Rodriguez
|style="font-size:88%"|Fall
|-
! style=background:white colspan=7 |
|-
|Loss
|6-2
|align=left| Kevin LeValley
|style="font-size:88%"|3-5
|style="font-size:88%" rowspan=5|January 28–31, 2015
|style="font-size:88%" rowspan=5|2015 Dave Schultz Memorial International
|style="text-align:left;font-size:88%;" rowspan=5|
 Colorado Springs, Colorado
|-
|Win
|6-1
|align=left| Nobuyoshi Takojima
|style="font-size:88%"|9-2
|-
|Loss
|5-1
|align=left| Dustin Schlatter
|style="font-size:88%"|TF 0-10
|-
|Win
|5-0
|align=left| Vladyslav Dombrovskiy
|style="font-size:88%"|7-4
|-
|Win
|4-0
|align=left| Ganbayar Sanjaa
|style="font-size:88%"|10-9
|-
! style=background:white colspan=7 |
|-
|Win
|3-0
|align=left| Michael Mitchell
|style="font-size:88%"|Fall
|style="font-size:88%" rowspan=3|December 18–20, 2014
|style="font-size:88%" rowspan=3|2014 Minnesota Storm Holiday Cup 
|style="text-align:left;font-size:88%;" rowspan=3|
 Rochester, Minnesota
|-
|Win
|2-0
|align=left| Joe Carr
|style="font-size:88%"|Fall
|-
|Win
|1-0
|align=left| Kevin LeValley
|style="font-size:88%"|5-4
|-

NCAA record 

! colspan="8"| NCAA Division III Championships Matches
|-
!  Res.
!  Record
!  Opponent
!  Score
!  Date
!  Event
|-
! style=background:white colspan=6 |2014 NCAA (DIII) Championships  at 157 lbs
|-
|Win
|12-0
|align=left|Dimitri Boyer
|style="font-size:88%"|Fall
|style="font-size:88%" rowspan=4|March 15, 2014
|style="font-size:88%" rowspan=4|2014 NCAA Division III Wrestling Championships
|-
|Win
|11-0
|align=left|Reece Lefever
|style="font-size:88%"|3-2
|-
|Win
|10-0
|align=left|Brett Yonkovic
|style="font-size:88%"|5-3
|-
|Win
|9-0
|align=left|Josh Etzel
|style="font-size:88%"|10-5
|-
! style=background:white colspan=6 |2013 NCAA (DIII) Championships  at 165 lbs
|-
|Win
|8-0
|align=left|John Darling
|style="font-size:88%"|5-3
|style="font-size:88%" rowspan=4|March 21, 2013
|style="font-size:88%" rowspan=4|2013 NCAA Division III Wrestling Championships
|-
|Win
|7-0
|align=left|Joey Favia
|style="font-size:88%"|7-2
|-
|Win
|6-0
|align=left|Owen Vernon
|style="font-size:88%"|7-6
|-
|Win
|5-0
|align=left|Garrett Bonte
|style="font-size:88%"|SV-1 5-3
|-
! style=background:white colspan=6 |2012 NCAA (DIII) Championships  at 157 lbs
|-
|Win
|4-0
|align=left|Orlando Ponce
|style="font-size:88%"|10-9
|style="font-size:88%" rowspan=4|March 10, 2012
|style="font-size:88%" rowspan=4|2012 NCAA Division III Wrestling Championships
|-
|Win
|3-0
|align=left|John Darling
|style="font-size:88%"|MD 14-5
|-
|Win
|2-0
|align=left|Cole Welter
|style="font-size:88%"|8-5
|-
|Win
|1-0
|align=left|Troy Sterling
|style="font-size:88%"|5-2
|-

References

External links
 

Living people
1992 births
Amateur wrestlers
American male sport wrestlers
Ukrainian male sport wrestlers
People from Chervonohrad
Sportspeople from Lviv Oblast